Tremont is a village in Tazewell County, Illinois, United States. The population was 2,236 at the 2010 census.  Tremont is located 14 miles southeast of Peoria.

History
Tremont was also host to Abraham Lincoln during his travels as a lawyer before his advancement into higher office. Lincoln visited the Tremont Courthouse in 1842; here, James Shields challenged him to a duel. Lincoln last spoke in Tremont on August 30, 1858. A marker now stands in commemoration of the courthouse.

Geography
The city hosts the annual Tremont Turkey Festival. The headquarters of the Tazewell County Health Department are in Tremont.

Demographics

Tremont is part of the Peoria, Illinois Metropolitan Statistical Area.

As of the census of 2010, there were 5,500 people, 900 households, and 750 families residing in the village and the surrounding upscale subdivisions and agricultural areas. There are 4 main subdivisions of Tremont: Lake Windemere, Royal Colony, Hickory Hills and Lake Knolls. The racial makeup of the village was 98.50% White, 0.50% African American, 0.34% Native American, 0.10% Asian, 0.10% from other races, and 0.10% from two or more races. Hispanic or Latino of any race were 0.44% of the population.

There were 816 households, out of which 31.7% had children under the age of 18 living with them, 62.1% were married couples living together, 7.5% had a female householder with no husband present, and 28.2% were non-families. 25.7% of all households were made up of individuals, and 10.2% had someone living alone who was 65 years of age or older. The average household size was 2.49 and the average family size was 2.99.

In the village, the population was spread out, with 25.8% under the age of 18, 7.7% from 18 to 24, 28.0% from 25 to 44, 22.3% from 45 to 64, and 16.2% who were 65 years of age or older. The median age was 37 years. For every 100 females, there were 93.1 males. For every 100 females age 18 and over, there were 89.9 males.

The median income for a household in the village was $85,137, and the median income for a family was $89,800. Males had a median income of $61,118 versus $44,750 for females. The per capita income for the village was $41,888. About 2.0% of families and 2.5% of the population were below the poverty line, including 2.9% of those under age 18 and 2.0% of those age 65 or over.

As of 2018, there are 5 churches, 2 grocery stores, 1 coffee shop, 1 fast food restaurant, 1 diner, 1 seasonal ice cream shack and 6 bars located in the township limits. There are also 4 gas stations, 2 banks, a library, and a fitness center.  Tremont Medical Clinic (now known as OSF Healthcare Tremont) provides the services of two general practice physicians (one specializing in women's issues), two nurse practitioners, and a physician assistant. For a 2010 full listing, view Tremont, Illinois Business Directory

Economy
The largest employer is R.A. Cullinan.   Precision Planting (AGCO) is located several miles south of Tremont.

Education
There are three public schools in Tremont: Tremont Gradeschool; Tremont Middle School, and Tremont High School. In 2004, the Tremont School District was honored with three awards from the State of Illinois, including the Bright A+ Award, the Bright Star Award, and the Financial Recognition Award.

The Tremont District Library is at the heart of the community in Tremont, IL. In addition to being able to check out books, movies, and other materials, the library frequently has activities for patrons of all ages. A few of the services they provide are: interlibrary loans, delivery to homebound patrons, and public computers, to name a few. The library is also a facility to locate resources for researching local history and genealogical materials.

Events
Tremont is most well known in central Illinois for its annual summer festival, The Tremont Turkey Festival.  The festival draws 20,000-30,000 people into the small village for the weekend. The festival includes free entertainment, bed races, an antique tractor pull, pageant, parade, craft and antique vendors, and a carnival. Tremont hosted its 50th Turkey Festival in 2015. The festival has remained entirely volunteer-run since 1966 and features Turkey sandwiches and Strawberry Shortcake.

Notable people
 Bonnie Cooper (1935-2018), baseball player
 Katy Nichole  (Born 2000), Christian singer
 Danny Lloyd (Born 1972), former Child actor, starred in The Shining (film) as Danny Torrance
 Myra Kingman (1873-1922), journalist and clubwoman
 Bob Trumpy (Born 1945), former NFL Tight-end for the Cincinnati Bengals (1968-1977).

References

External links
 
 Tremont Park District
 Tremont Turkey Festival

Villages in Tazewell County, Illinois
Villages in Illinois
Peoria metropolitan area, Illinois
Populated places established in 1834
1834 establishments in Illinois